Jadwiga Wajs-Marcinkiewicz (30 January 1912 in Pabianice, Russian Empire – 1 February 1990) was a Polish  athlete who mainly competed in the discus throw.

Career
She competed for Poland at the 1932 Summer Olympics held in Los Angeles, United States, in the women's discus throw event, winning the bronze medal.

Four years later she threw the discus again for Poland in the 1936 Summer Olympics held in Berlin, Germany where she split the German pair Gisela Mauermayer and Paula Mollenhauer in winning the silver medal.  Jadwiga Wajs was Jewish, her father's ancestors came to Livonia and Poland from Westfalen in the 13th century. Their heraldic crest was the white swan.

References

External links
 

1912 births
1990 deaths
Polish female discus throwers
Polish female shot putters
Polish people of Jewish descent
Olympic athletes of Poland
Athletes (track and field) at the 1932 Summer Olympics
Athletes (track and field) at the 1936 Summer Olympics
Athletes (track and field) at the 1948 Summer Olympics
Olympic silver medalists for Poland
Olympic bronze medalists for Poland
People from Pabianice
World record setters in athletics (track and field)
European Athletics Championships medalists
Sportspeople from Łódź Voivodeship
People from Piotrków Governorate
People from the Russian Empire of German descent
Polish people of German descent
Medalists at the 1936 Summer Olympics
Medalists at the 1932 Summer Olympics
Olympic silver medalists in athletics (track and field)
Olympic bronze medalists in athletics (track and field)
Women's World Games medalists
Recipients of the Silver Cross of Merit (Poland)
Members of the Polish Gymnastic Society "Sokół"